The Brandenburg an der Havel tramway network is a network of tramways forming the centrepiece of the public transport system in Brandenburg an der Havel, a city in the federal state of Brandenburg, Germany.

Opened in 1897 as a horsecar system, the network was converted to an electrically powered system in 1911.

== Lines ==
, the network had four lines, as follows:

Line 1/2 replaces lines 1 and 2 on Sundays and public holidays.

See also
List of town tramway systems in Germany
Trams in Germany

References

External links
 
 Track plan of the Brandenburg tram system
 
 
 Brandenburg tram 

Transport in Brandenburg
Brandenburg An Der Havel
Metre gauge railways in Germany
Brandenburg